Harmologa sanguinea is a species of moth of the family Tortricidae. It is found in New Zealand.

The wingspan is about 17–18.5 mm. The forewings are dark purplish red with a silvery fascia intermixed with yellow or orange. The hindwings are dark fuscous. Adult males have been recorded amongst Veronica and Cassinia bushes in January.

References

Moths described in 1915
Archipini
Moths of New Zealand